Joshua Ryan Zuckerman (born April 1, 1985) is an American actor. He is known for playing Mark Cullin in the science fiction TV series Kyle XY, Eddie Orlofsky in Desperate Housewives and Nate Marlowe in the comedy series Significant Mother. He also had a recurring role as Max Miller in the CW drama 90210. He voiced the lead role of Pony in the Nickelodeon original animated series It's Pony.

Early life
Zuckerman was born and raised in Los Altos, California, into a family of five children. He attended Bullis-Purisima Elementary School there. He began formally acting at the age of ten, with a series of roles at the nearby Bus Barn Theater with the Los Altos Youth Theater company. He moved to Los Angeles to pursue an acting career after finishing the seventh grade at Egan Junior High School, where he had been elected student body president. He is of Jewish descent.

He attended The Buckley School in Sherman Oaks. In 2003 he attended Princeton University, where he was a member of the Delta Kappa Epsilon fraternity, where he earned the pledge name "Checkers".  After his freshman year he did not return to Princeton, deciding instead to focus on his acting career.

Career
Zuckerman made his professional on-camera debut in 2000 opposite Julia Louis-Dreyfus and Drew Carey in the Disney Channel musical fantasy Geppetto, then enjoyed guest roles on the TV series NYPD Blue and Once and Again. 

Zuckerman's assignments continued during his enrollment as a student at Princeton University, though over time he began to increasingly emphasize big-screen work, notably with supporting roles in the Ben Affleck, James Gandolfini holiday comedy Surviving Christmas (2004) and the Evan Rachel Wood dark comedy Pretty Persuasion (2005). In 2008, Zuckerman appeared in a multi-episode arc, as Mark, on the ABC Family series Kyle XY. 

Later that year, Zuckerman signed for one of his first starring roles, as a teen who ventures out on a cross-country road trip, along with two friends, to meet a girl he's been chatting with online and lose his virginity to her, in the teen-oriented sex comedy-road movie Sex Drive.
 
He played Eddie Orlofsky on Desperate Housewives. Zuckerman had a recurring role in the CW series 90210 as Naomi's love interest, Max Miller.

Filmography

Film

Television

References

External links

1985 births
Living people
21st-century American male actors
Male actors from the San Francisco Bay Area
American male film actors
American male television actors
American male voice actors
Princeton University alumni